Hope was launched in 1804 at Calcutta. She made one voyage for the British East India Company (EIC). She continued to trade around India until a French frigate captured her in 1808. She apparently returned to English hands and was renamed Madras Merchant. She was then sold in 1816 at Manila.

Career
Hope, Captain J. Cook, sailed from Bengal on 22 August 1805. She was serving as a packet for the EIC. She reached Saint Helena on 12 November and arrived at the Downs on 2 January 1806.

Hope was admitted to the Registry of Great Britain on 15 March 1806. She appears in the Register of Shipping with J. Cook, master and owner, and trade London–India. Similarly, the Register of Shipping for 1809 shows Hope with J. Cook, master and owner, and trade London–India.

Fate
A letter from Madras dated 17 December 1808 reported that a French frigate, possibly , captured the brig Jane, Bennet, master, off Pedang, and Hope, Cook, sailing to Bengal.

According to one report Hope returned to British hands and was renamed Madras Merchant. She was sold at Manila in 1816. It is possible that Hope was the  French ship "Le Hope, of 400 Tons", that was among the many vessels that the British captured on 3 December 1810 when they captured Mauritius.

A Madras Merchant visited Java several times in 1814 with masters F. Strant and Charles Eaton.

Citations and references
Citations

References
 
 
 
 

1804 ships
British ships built in India
Ships of the British East India Company
Age of Sail merchant ships of England
Captured ships